The FM-7 ("Fujitsu Micro 7") is a home computer created by Fujitsu. It was first released in 1982 and was sold in Japan and Spain. It is a stripped-down version of Fujitsu's earlier FM-8 computer, and during development it was referred to as the "FM-8 Jr.".

Although it was designed to be a cut-down version of the FM-8 (with the FM-7 costing 126,000 yen, compared to 218,000 yen for the FM-8), most notably removing the (expensive) bubble memory technology, the FM-7 was given a more advanced AY-3-8910 sound chip capable of three voice sound synthesis, leading to a strong uptake among the hobbyist computer market in Japan and making it a more popular system than the FM-8.

The FM-7 primarily competed with the NEC PC-8801 and Sharp X1 series of computers in the early 1980s. It was succeeded by the FM-77 series of computers in 1984, which featured backwards compatibility with the FM-7. The FM-77 series was later succeeded by the 32-bit FM Towns in 1989.

The FM-7 is based around the 6809 chip, which was also used in home computers such as the TRS-80 Color Computer and Dragon 32/64, as well as several arcade games.

Hardware
Two MC 68B09 CPUs @ 2 MHz: one main CPU and one graphics processor.
Screen Resolution: 640×200, 8 colors
Memory: 40 KB ROM, 64 KB RAM
Sound: 3-channel (AY-3-8910) PSG chip, built-in speaker mounted near the top of the unit. From FM77AV onwards, the system includes the 6-channel YM2203 (3 PSG channels + 3 FM channels, making it a total of six).
Interfaces: RS-232, monitor and Centronics ports, 3 expansion slots.
Storage: 5.25" floppy disk
Operating system: OS-9, (compatible with Color Computer)
Three slots for optional plug-in cards, including a Z-80 CPU and additional RS-232 ports.
Full-size keyboard, with keys handling multiple functions (as many as 5, depending on what SHIFT/KANA/GRAPH/etc key is pressed).
10 Function Keys at the top, pre-programmed with shortcuts (LIST, etc.).
Numeric keypad (on right) and cursor-control keys (upper-right).

F-BASIC
The included "F-BASIC" is an enhanced version of the Color BASIC language used on the TRS-80 Color Computer. Changes include a different character set that includes katakana and a few kanji, the ability to have graphics appear on the default text screen, and several new commands such as BEEP, CONNECT, MON, SYMBOL, INTERVAL, MERGE, RANDOMIZE, SWAP, and TERM. There are also strings for TIME$ and DATE$, which access a temporary built-in internal clock, though if the power is turned off, the time and date are lost.

While F-Basic has commands that Color BASIC does not, most commands featured in both versions of the language operate in exactly the same fashion.

While the BASIC EDIT command works the same as on Color BASIC, the cursor position is important on the FM-7: there is a small keypad on the upper-right of the FM-7 with cursor-control keys (arrows, INSERT & DELETE), and wherever the user decides to position the cursor, it will move it there and affect whatever is underneath it.

Both Microsoft and Fujitsu share the copyright on the BASIC.

Models 
There were several models of the computer:
 1982 — FM-7: M68B09, RAM 64 KB, ROM 48 KB, VRAM 48 KB,  640×200, 8 colors
 1984 — FM-NEW7: M68B09 integrated memory and LSI chip (cheap production). The features are the same as the FM-7.
 1984 — FM77: M68B09E, RAM 64 KB (max 256 KB), VRAM 48 KB
 1985 — FM77L2, M68B09E
 1985 — FM77L4, M68B09E
 1985 — FM77AV: M68B09E, RAM 128 KB (max 192 KB), ROM 48 KB, VRAM 96 KB, 640×200 (8 colors), 320×200 (4096 colors), 4096 colors, 1 (AV-1) or 2 (AV-2) floppy 3.5-inch 320 KB
 1986 — FM77AV20: M68B09E, like FM77AV but: floppy 640 KB
 1986 — FM77AV40: M68B09E, like FM77AV20 but: RAM 192 KB (max 448 KB), VRAM 144 KB to support 320×200 (262144 colors)
 1987 — FM77AV20EX: M68B09E, RAM 128 KB (max 192 KB), VRAM 96 KB, 640x400 ?
 1987 — FM77AV40EX: M68B09E, RAM 192 KB (max 448 KB), VRAM 144 KB, 640x400 ?
 1988 — FM77AV40SX: M68B09E, RAM 192 KB (max 448 KB), VRAM 144 KB

References

External links 
 Fujitsu FM 7, OLD-COMPUTERS.COM Museum
 The Fujitsu FM-7 , 8-Bit Computer Page, Larry's Homepage
 Oh!FM-7 museum

Fujitsu computers
6809-based home computers
Home video game consoles